Shimpei Cole Ota (太田 心平; 오타 심페이, 1975 – ) is a sociocultural anthropologist, sociocultural historian, researcher of Northeast Asian studies and curator of ethnology. He is an associate professor of cross-field research at the National Museum of Ethnology which is the largest research institute for the humanities in Japan and is one of the six members of the National Institutes for the Humanities, Japan (NIHU). Ota is also working for the Graduate University for Advanced Studies as an associate professor of museum studies, and is affiliated at the American Museum of Natural History as a research associate of anthropology.

Career
Ota was born in Osaka City and earned his BA (1998), MA (2000), then PhD (2007) in human sciences from Osaka University. He also completed an additional doctoral program in anthropology at Seoul National University from 2000 to 2003. Before joining NIHU, he lived in Korea for seven years.

Research
Ota's research examines people's recognition of cultures. More specifically, he tries to explain how people and societies recognize their own cultural "change." What do the narratives and discourses of personal change and social shift epistemologically mean? He has pursued this question mainly through case studies of Korean political history and intellectual subculture. For example, his publications explore South Korean activists' recognition of Korean "democratization," and the cultural history of Korean scholar-bureaucrats from their descendants' point of view during the 17th to 19th centuries. Ota has also been conducting researches on Korean celadon ceramics, on oversea Koreans in Mainland China and United States, and on museum administration.

Note

References

External links
National Museum of Ethnology | Associate Professor Shimpei Ota 
American Museum of Natural History | Research Associate Shimpei Ota
Shimpei Cole Ota (Personal Website)

Living people
1975 births
Koreanists
Social anthropologists